The 1936 New York Yankees season was the team's 34th season. The team finished with a record of 102–51, winning their 8th pennant, finishing 19.5 games ahead of the Detroit Tigers. New York was managed by Joe McCarthy. The Yankees played at Yankee Stadium. In the World Series, they defeated the New York Giants in 6 games.

Offseason
 Prior to 1936 season: Billy Johnson was signed as an amateur free agent by the Yankees.

Regular season
 May 3, 1936: Joe DiMaggio made his major league debut, batting ahead of Lou Gehrig. The Yankees had not been to the World Series since 1932, but, thanks in large part to their sensational rookie, they won the 1936 World Series.
 May 24, 1936: Tony Lazzeri of the Yankees hit two grand slams in one game, the first time this had been accomplished in the major leagues.

Season standings

Record vs. opponents

Roster

Player stats

Batting

Starters by position
Note: Pos = Position; G = Games played; AB = At bats; H = Hits; Avg. = Batting average; HR = Home runs; RBI = Runs batted in

Other batters
Note: G = Games played; AB = At bats; H = Hits; Avg. = Batting average; HR = Home runs; RBI = Runs batted in

Pitching

Starting pitchers
Note: G = Games pitched; IP = Innings pitched; W = Wins; L = Losses; ERA = Earned run average; SO = Strikeouts

Other pitchers
Note: G = Games pitched; IP = Innings pitched; W = Wins; L = Losses; ERA = Earned run average; SO = Strikeouts

Relief pitchers
Note: G = Games pitched; W = Wins; L = Losses; SV = Saves; ERA = Earned run average; SO = Strikeouts

1936 World Series

Farm system

LEAGUE CHAMPIONS: Norfolk, Bassett

Notes

References
1936 New York Yankees at Baseball Reference
1936 World Series
1936 New York Yankees team page at www.baseball-almanac.com

New York Yankees seasons
New York Yankees
New York Yankees
1930s in the Bronx
American League champion seasons
World Series champion seasons